Children's radio is a radio format aimed primarily at preteen children.  Examples include the now defunct Radio Disney network of radio stations, Kids Place Live satellite radio channel and in the UK Fun Kids.

Stations

See also
List of children radio networks

External links

 
Radio formats